Krishna Pauroti (also called Krishna Loaf or Krishna Breads) is a Nepali bakery. It was founded in 1948 by Krishna Bahadur Rajkarnikar in Kamal Pokhari, Kathmandu, Nepal. Kai Weise, a correspondent of The Himalayan Times, labelled Krishna Pauroti "the first bakery in Nepal".

References 

Bakeries of Nepal
Companies based in Kathmandu
1948 establishments in Nepal